The 2015–16 San Jose Sharks season was the 25th season for the National Hockey League franchise that was established on May 9, 1990. The team began its regular season on October 7, 2015 against the Los Angeles Kings. The Sharks reached the Stanley Cup Finals for the first time in franchise history, ultimately losing to the Pittsburgh Penguins in six games.

Standings

Schedule and results

Pre-season

Regular season

Playoffs

The Sharks entered the playoffs as the Pacific Division's third seed and faced the second seed of the same division, the Los Angeles Kings, winning 4–1. In the second round they faced the Nashville Predators and advanced in seven games. In the Conference Finals, the Sharks met the St. Louis Blues, winning the series 4–2 and advancing to their first Stanley Cup final in history, where they lost in six games against the Pittsburgh Penguins.

Player statistics
Skaters

Goaltenders

†Denotes player spent time with another team before joining the Sharks.  Stats reflect time with the Sharks only.
‡Traded mid-season

Awards and honours

Awards

Milestones

Suspensions and fines

Transactions
The Sharks have been involved in the following transactions during the 2015–16 season:

Trades

Free agents acquired

Free agents lost

Lost via waivers

Player signings

Draft picks

Below are the San Jose Sharks' selections at the 2015 NHL Entry Draft, to be held on June 26–27, 2015 at the BB&T Center in Sunrise, Florida.

Draft notes

 The Buffalo Sabres' second-round pick (from Colorado) went to the San Jose Sharks as the result of a trade on June 27, 2015 that sent a second-round pick in 2015, a second-round pick in 2016 and a sixth-round pick in 2017 to Colorado in exchange for this pick.
 The San Jose Sharks' second-round pick went to the Colorado Avalanche as the result of a trade on June 27, 2015 that a second-round pick in 2015 to San Jose in exchange for a second-round pick in 2016, a sixth-round pick in 2017 and this pick.
 The San Jose Sharks' third-round pick went to the Philadelphia Flyers as the result of a trade on July 2, 2014 that sent Tye McGinn to San Jose in exchange for this pick.
 The St. Louis Blues' third-round pick (from Edmonton) went to the San Jose Sharks as the result of compensation for Head Coach Todd McLellan.
 The San Jose Sharks' fourth-round pick went to the Nashville Predators as the result of a trade on June 28, 2014 that sent Detroit's second-round pick in 2014 to San Jose in exchange for a second-round pick in 2014 and this pick.
 The Calgary Flames' fourth-round pick went to the San Jose Sharks as the result of a trade on July 2, 2013 that sent TJ Galiardi to Calgary in exchange for this pick.
 The New York Islanders' fifth-round pick went to the San Jose Sharks as the result of a trade on June 5, 2014 that sent Dan Boyle to New York in exchange for this pick (being conditional at the time of the trade). The condition – San Jose will receive a fifth-round pick in 2015 if Boyle is not re-signed by the Islanders for the 2014–15 NHL season – was converted on July 1, 2014.
 The Dallas Stars' seventh-round pick went to the San Jose Sharks as the result of a trade on June 27, 2015 that sent the rights to Antti Niemi to Dallas in exchange for this pick.

References

San Jose Sharks seasons
San Jose Sharks season, 2015-16
Western Conference (NHL) championship seasons
San Jose
San Jose Sharks
San Jose Sharks